Hubert Perrodo (25 January 1944 - 29 December 2006) was a French businessman, polo player and art collector. He was the founder and sole owner of the oil group Perenco.

Early life

Hubert Perrodo was born on 25 January 1944 in Larmor-Baden in Morbihan, Brittany, to a family of fishermen.

Career

Polo

His polo team, Labégorce, won the Queen's Cup, in 2004.  On a journey to Château Giscours, in Margaux to play polo, he learned that Château Labégorce Zédé was for sale. He bought it in August 1989 and went on to become a large wine producer.  In 2001, he repurchased the Castle of Abbot Gorsse de Gorsse, in February 2002 bought Labégorce-Zédé Castle, and in June 2006 he bought the Château Marquis d'Alesme Becker.

Art collection

He was a prominent art collector, mostly focused on paintings.

Later life

He died on 29 December 2006 — one month before his 63rd birthday — in a hiking accident, descending La Dent du Villard mountain trail near Courchevel.

Personal life
He was married to Ka Yee Wong, later known as Carrie Perrodo. They had three children, François Hubert Marie Perrodo (born 14 February 1977), chairman of Perenco, Nathalie Perrodo-Samani (born 1980) and Bertrand Nicolas Hubert Perrodo (born 1984).

References

1944 births
2006 deaths
20th-century French businesspeople